The Shanghai Skywalkers are a professional arena football team based in Shanghai, China. They are members of the China Arena Football League (CAFL).

Current roster

Seasons

References

External links
 China Arena Football League official website

 
China Arena Football League teams
2016 establishments in China
Sports teams in Shanghai
American football teams established in 2016